Hatebreeder is the second studio album by Finnish heavy metal band Children of Bodom.  The "Deluxe Edition" was released in 2005 with bonus material. It was also re-released in 2008.

Reception
In 2005, Hatebreeder was ranked number 492 in Rock Hard magazine's book of The 500 Greatest Rock & Metal Albums of All Time.

Track listing

Personnel
Children of Bodom
Alexi Laiho – lead guitar, vocals
Alexander Kuoppala – rhythm guitar
Henkka Seppälä – bass
Janne Wirman – keyboards
Jaska Raatikainen – drums
Gang vocals on "Warheart", "Black Widow", and "Children of Bodom" by Children of Bodom

Additional performer
Kimberly Goss – screams

Production
Produced and recorded by Anssi Kippo
Mixed by Mikko Karmila
Mastered by Mika Jussila
Artwork by Graham French
Design and layout by Apurator

Charts

References

1999 albums
Children of Bodom albums
Nuclear Blast albums
Spinefarm Records albums